The Fighter is a 1921 American silent drama film directed by Henry Kolker and starring Conway Tearle, Winifred Westover and Arthur Housman.

Cast
 Conway Tearle as Caleb Conover
 Winifred Westover as Dey Shevlin
 Arthur Housman as Blacardo
 Ernest Lawford as Caine
 George Stewart as Jack Standish
 Warren Cook as Senator Burke
 Helen Lindroth as Mrs. Hawarden

References

Bibliography
 Munden, Kenneth White. The American Film Institute Catalog of Motion Pictures Produced in the United States, Part 1. University of California Press, 1997.

External links
 

1921 films
1921 drama films
1920s English-language films
American silent feature films
Silent American drama films
American black-and-white films
Films directed by Henry Kolker
Selznick Pictures films
1920s American films